Glekson Marrone Pires Santos (born 15 September 1992), known as Marrone, is a Brazilian footballer who plays for ASA. Mainly a left back, he can also play as a defensive midfielder.

Club career
Born in Ouro Preto do Oeste, Rondônia, Marrone graduated with Avaí's youth setup. He made his professional debut on 24 November 2012, coming on as a second-half substitute in a 1–1 home draw against Criciúma for the Série B championship.

After rejecting a loan deal to Marcílio Dias, Marrone was made a starter by manager Geninho in 2014, being successfully converted to a left back. He scored his first professional goal on 10 September 2014, netting the third in a 4–1 away win against Bragantino.

Marrone appeared in 23 matches and scored two goals during the campaign, also winning promotion to Série A.

References

External links

Marrone at playmakerstats.com (English version of ogol.com.br)

1992 births
Living people
Sportspeople from Rondônia
Brazilian footballers
Association football defenders
Association football midfielders
Association football utility players
Campeonato Brasileiro Série B players
Avaí FC players
Volta Redonda FC players
ABC Futebol Clube players
Capivariano Futebol Clube players
Tombense Futebol Clube players
Agremiação Sportiva Arapiraquense players